David Quinn (born July 30, 1966) is an American professional ice hockey coach and former player. He is currently the head coach of the San Jose Sharks of the National Hockey League (NHL) and United States men's national hockey team. He was formerly head coach of the New York Rangers of the National Hockey League (NHL), for 3 seasons; the Lake Erie Monsters of the American Hockey League, an assistant coach for the Colorado Avalanche of the NHL, and the head men's hockey coach at Boston University. He was formally inducted into the Rhode Island Hockey Hall of Fame in 2021.

Career

Playing career
After his prep career at the Kent School, he was drafted in the first round, 13th overall, by the Minnesota North Stars in the 1984 NHL Entry Draft.

Quinn forwent turning professional immediately after being drafted, and instead played collegiately for Boston University.  After his junior season, he tried out for the 1988 U.S. Olympic Team.  However, during his tryout he was diagnosed with Haemophilia B (also known as Christmas disease), a rare disorder which prevents blood from clotting properly.  Due to the disorder, Quinn was forced to retire from the game.

Quinn was later able to find funding for expensive medication to combat the disease, and he was given a tryout for the 1992 U.S. Olympic team.  He did not make the team, but he did attract the attention of the New York Rangers, who signed him to his first professional contract in February 1992.  Quinn finished the 1991–92 season with the Rangers' American Hockey League affiliate, the Binghamton Rangers.  He then played the entire 1992–93 season with the Cleveland Lumberjacks of the International Hockey League.  He retired following that season, however, without ever making the National Hockey League.

Coaching career
After retiring from playing, Quinn began a career as a coach. After serving as an assistant coach for Northeastern University, Quinn joined a fledgling program at the University of Nebraska-Omaha.  After helping build the program at Omaha for six years, Quinn left to become a developmental coach for USA Hockey.  He then worked as an assistant at his alma mater, Boston University, helping the Terriers to the National Title in 2009.

On June 22, 2009, Quinn was introduced as head coach for the Lake Erie Monsters of the American Hockey League (AHL), affiliate of the Colorado Avalanche of the National Hockey League (NHL). It marked a return to Cleveland where he played with the Lumberjacks of the IHL. He coached Lake Erie from 2009 to 2012. On June 14, 2012, Quinn was named as an assistant coach for the Colorado Avalanche of the NHL.

On March 25, 2013, Quinn was named the eleventh head coach of Boston University, replacing Jack Parker.

On May 23, 2018, the New York Rangers announced that Quinn was hired as head coach. On October 11, Quinn picked up his first NHL regular season win, against the San Jose Sharks. On May 12, 2021, the Rangers fired Quinn after the team failed to make the playoffs.

In December 2021, Quinn was named as the head coach for the US men's ice hockey team for the 2022 Winter Olympics after Pittsburgh Penguins head coach Mike Sullivan could not proceed with the NHL pulling out of the Olympics.

On July 26, 2022, Quinn was named head coach of the San Jose Sharks, returning to the NHL.

On March 4, 2023, Quinn was ejected for the first time of his NHL coaching career in a loss to the Washington Capitals. His ejection was the first NHL coach ejection since Jon Cooper's ejection on March 3, 2022, and the first Sharks coach ejection since Peter DeBoer on November 25, 2018.

Career statistics

Regular season and playoffs

International

Head coaching record

NHL

NCAA

Awards and honors

References

External links

David Quinn's profile @ hockeydraftcentral.com

1966 births
American men's ice hockey defensemen
Binghamton Rangers players
Boston University Terriers men's ice hockey players
Boston University Terriers men's ice hockey coaches
Cleveland Lumberjacks players
Colorado Avalanche coaches
Ice hockey coaches from Rhode Island
Kent School alumni
Living people
Minnesota North Stars draft picks
National Hockey League first-round draft picks
New York Rangers coaches
Sportspeople from Cranston, Rhode Island
Ice hockey players from Rhode Island
United States men's national ice hockey team coaches
Ice hockey coaches at the 2022 Winter Olympics